Angelakis is a Greek surname. Notable people with the surname include:
Andreas N. Angelakis (born 1937), Greek civil engineer and agronomist
Dora E. Angelaki, Greek neuroscientist
Jana Angelakis (born 1962), American fencer

See also
Angelaki, academic journal

Greek-language surnames